Burn Hugh Gorman (born 1 September 1974) is an English actor and musician. He is known for his roles as Owen Harper in the BBC series Torchwood (2006–2008), Phillip Stryver in The Dark Knight Rises (2012), Clubfoot Karl Tanner in the HBO series Game of Thrones (2013–2014), Hermann Gottlieb in Pacific Rim (2013) and its sequel Pacific Rim: Uprising (2018) and Major Edmund Hewlett in the AMC series Turn: Washington's Spies (2014). Gorman portrayed 'The Marshal' in the first season of the Amazon drama The Man in the High Castle and Adolphus Murtry, Royal Charter Energy security chief on the exploratory mission to the planet Ilus in season four of The Expanse.

Early life
Burn Hugh Gorman was born on 1 September 1974 in Los Angeles, California, the son of English parents. His father was a professor of linguistics at UCLA. He has three older sisters. He has reportedly claimed to be the nephew of Bartley Gorman, considered "King of the Gypsies". At the age of 7, he moved with his family back to England, where they settled in London. He later trained at the Manchester School of Theatre at Manchester Metropolitan University.

Career
One of Gorman's earliest television roles was in 1998 as Etheric Foundation cult leader Ben Andrews in Granada TV's Coronation Street. He played William Guppy in the 2005 BBC One adaptation of Charles Dickens' Bleak House, before being cast as Owen Harper in the BBC science fiction series Torchwood. Gorman starred in the first two series of the show before his character was killed off in the series 2 finale, "Exit Wounds".

Other BBC television roles include Lark Rise to Candleford, Funland and Bonekickers; he also appeared in Channel 4's political thriller Low Winter Sun. 

Gorman played scriptwriter Ray Galton in the BBC Four television play The Curse of Steptoe. He has also appeared in television series such as Dalziel and Pascoe, Casualty, Merseybeat and The Inspector Lynley Mysteries.

Gorman played Jed on the soap opera EastEnders in March 2007. He starred as Hindley Earnshaw in the ITV adaptation of Emily Brontë's Wuthering Heights. In 2011, he starred in Sky1's second Martina Cole adaptation, The Runaway and in 2014, portrayed Adam, the lead character's stalker and fellow immortal, in ABC's Forever. He played Karl Tanner in seasons 3 and 4 of HBO's Game of Thrones, Major Hewlett in the AMC miniseries Turn and Nicholas Farlow on the BBC miniseries Jamestown.

On film, Gorman has had roles in Layer Cake, The Best Man, Penelope, Fred Claus, Cemetery Junction and The Dark Knight Rises. He also appeared as Dr. Hermann Gottlieb in the film Pacific Rim and its sequel Pacific Rim: Uprising.

On radio, Gorman played Elizabethan spy Robert Poley in Michael Butt's The Babington Plot (2008) and Unauthorized History: The Killing (2010) and Mike Walker's The Reckoning: The Death of Christopher Marlowe (2022).

Gorman's stage credits include Ladybird (Royal Court), Flush (Soho Theatre), and Gong Donkeys (Bush Theatre), prompting Michael Billington of The Guardian to write that "Gorman proves that he is one of the best young actors in Britain". He has performed in readings, workshops, and development initiatives with the National Theatre Studio, Young Vic, Royal Court, Oxford Stage Company, Paines Plough and Soho Theatre. Outside London, he has worked with Nottingham Playhouse, the Theatre Royal, Plymouth and the Royal Exchange and Contact Theatres, where he was nominated for a Manchester Evening News Best Newcomer Award.

From 2008 to 2009, Gorman played Bill Sikes in the West End revival of the musical Oliver! for which he was nominated for Best Supporting Actor in a Musical in the 2010 Whatsonstage Theatre Awards.

Personal life
Gorman married schoolteacher Sarah Beard on 17 July 2004. They have three children, two girls and a boy. Their first child, Max, was born in Cardiff, where Gorman was filming the first series of Torchwood. They separated and divorced in 2017.

Filmography

Film

Television

Video games

Radio

References

External links

Burn Gorman Interview on Starpulse

1974 births
Living people
Alumni of Manchester Metropolitan University
British male film actors
British male radio actors
British male soap opera actors
British male stage actors
British male video game actors
British male voice actors
Male actors from Hollywood, Los Angeles
Male actors from London
20th-century British male actors
21st-century British male actors